Delonix floribunda is a species of plant in the family Fabaceae. It is found only in Madagascar.

It has very large flat heads of yellow flowers in late spring. It is grown as a showy ornamental in rich soil in a temperate to tropical climate. It can be propagated from seed.

References

External links
Delonix floribunda

floribunda
Endemic flora of Madagascar
Taxonomy articles created by Polbot
Taxa named by Henri Ernest Baillon
Taxa named by René Paul Raymond Capuron